Nataša Petrović (Macedonian: Наташа Петровиќ; Serbian Cyrillic: Наташа Петровић; born 31 August 1988), also known as Natasha Petrovic, is a Macedonian actress of Serbian descent. She made her on–screen debut in 2007 Macedonian film Shadows by Milčo Mančevski, and reached a worldwide success with 2010 film As If I Am Not There by Juanita Wilson, which was selected as the Irish entry for the Best Foreign Language Film at the 84th Academy Awards.

Career 
Petrovic made her on–screen debut with a small role in Shadows, a 2007 Macedonian film directed by Milčo Mančevski. In 2009, she landed the lead role in Irish film As If I Am Not There, directed by Juanita Wilson, which premiered in 2010. Although most of the film was shot in Serbo-Croatian language, it was selected as the Irish entry for the Best Foreign Language Film at the 84th Academy Awards. As If I Am Not There garnered positive reviews, while Petrovic's personal performance earned her Seattle International Film Festival Award for Best Actress, as well as the Irish Film and Television Award for Best International Actress and Milan International Film Festival Award for Best Acting Performance – Female nominations.

At the 61st Berlin International Film Festival, Petrovic was one of ten European actors — including Andrea Riseborough, Clara Lago, Alexander Fehling, and Domhnall Gleeson — that were presented the Shooting Stars Award by the European Film Promotion. American magazine Variety also named her as one of the most promising actresses today. In 2011, Petrovic made her stage debut as Célimène in The Misanthrope by Molière. The same year, she played Elikia in The Sound of Cracking Bones by Suzanne Lebeau.

In 2012 she took part in the film The Piano Room directed by Igor Ivanov - Izi where she plays the leading woman role that premiered at Manaki Film Festival 2013 and also the film To The Hilt directed by the Academy Award Nominee Stole Popov, that premiered 2014 at the Manaki Film Festival. In 2013 she played the role Katerina in the feature film Lazar directed by Svetozar Ristovski that had a premiere in 2015. Natasha was also the leading women role in the feature film Elixir shot in Berlin, directed by Brodie Higgs, playing the role of Lexia. This film premiered at the Berlinale in 2015 having a world premiere. She later played Ines in the feature film The Witness, directed by Mitko Panov, where she played alongside Bruno Ganz.

In 2018 she played the role of Milica in the German TV series Pagan Peak (Der Pass).

Her latest film Only Human by Igor Ivanov, where she plays the role of Keti, had premiere in 2020.

Personal life 
Petrovic speaks in Macedonian, Serbian, English, Bosnian, German, Bulgarian, Italian and Spanish. She has been studying drama at the St. Cyril and Methodius University since 2007, and is expected to graduate in 2011. Petrovic has been compared to the triple Academy Award winner Ingrid Bergman for her beauty and talent.

Filmography

Stage credits

Awards and nominations

References

External links 
 

1988 births
Living people
People from Štip
Macedonian stage actresses
21st-century actresses
Macedonian film actresses